Paepaetele Stan To'omalatai (born 13 December 1962, in Apia) is a Samoan rugby union player. He plays as a hooker. He is father of the rugby player Carisbrook To'omalatai, who plays for Otago.

Career
To'omalatai made his debut for Western Samoa on June 1, 1985, in a test match against Fiji at Apia. He was part of the Samoan team in the 1991 Rugby World Cup and in the 1994 Western Samoa rugby union tour of Australia. He was not present in the 1995 Rugby World Cup team. His last international match was during a test match against Fiji at Apia, on July 1, 1995.

Coaching career
Between 2008 and 2011, To'omalatai, along with fellow Samoan international Andrew Aiolupo, coached Savaii Samoa. He also worked as assistant coach for the Samoa coach Aveau Niko Palamo in 2008-2009. He also took part at several charity events.

References

External links
 
 Stan To'omalatai at New Zealand Rugby History

1962 births
Living people
Sportspeople from Apia
Samoan rugby union coaches
Samoan rugby union players
Rugby union hookers
Samoa international rugby union players